Garden City is an unincorporated community and census-designated place (CDP) in Garden City Township, Blue Earth County, Minnesota, United States. Its population was 255 as of the 2010 census.

History
A post office called Garden City was established in 1857. The community was named from the garden-like setting of the original town site. The First Baptist Church building was completed in 1868.

The Blue Earth County Fair has been held in Garden City since 1860 with the exception of a few years the fair was cancelled.

In 1921, on a visit from London, Henry Wellcome donated land he had purchased to the hamlet of Garden City to build a consolidated school.  The school that was built on the site became Wellcome Memorial school, eventually combining with Rapidan,  Vernon Center, and  Lake Crystal school districts.  The building now serves as the site of Wellcome Manor Family Services.

Notable people
Henry Wellcome (1853-1936), pharmaceutical entrepreneur

References

Census-designated places in Blue Earth County, Minnesota
Census-designated places in Minnesota
1857 establishments in Minnesota Territory
Populated places established in 1857